Arthenas is a former commune in the Jura department in the region of Bourgogne-Franche-Comté in eastern France. On 1 January 2016, it was merged into the new commune of La Chailleuse.

Population

See also
Communes of the Jura department

References

Former communes of Jura (department)
Populated places disestablished in 2016
2016 disestablishments in France